Mei Qiaoling (25 September 1842 – 16 December 1882), born Mei Fang, courtesy name Xiaobo and art name Huixian, was a Qing dynasty Peking opera and kunqu artist based in Beijing. He specialized in playing dan roles, or women. Originally from Taizhou, Jiangsu, he was sold to a childless man in Suzhou at age 8. After that man remarried and begot a son, Mei was sold again, this time to a theatrical troupe where he had to train to become a performer. He rose to stardom despite his pudginess, which earned him the nickname "Fat Qiaoling". At age 30, he became the leader of the Four Happiness Troupe, one of the most famous troupes in Beijing, and rarely performed after that.

His son Mei Yutian was also a performer. His grandson Mei Lanfang was the most accomplished Peking opera artist of all time.

In popular culture
In the 2002 comedy TV series The Best Clown Under Heaven, Mei Qiaoling is portrayed by Peking opera actor Song Xiaochuan.

References

Chinese male Peking opera actors
19th-century Chinese male actors
19th-century Chinese male singers
Singers from Jiangsu
Male actors from Jiangsu
People from Taizhou, Jiangsu
1842 births
1882 deaths
Female impersonators in Peking opera